Downtown Bellevue is the central business district of Bellevue, Washington, United States. It is the second largest city center in Washington state, with more than 50,000 employees and 12,000 residents.

Transportation
Downtown Bellevue is the main Eastside hub for both the local transit authority, King County Metro, and Sound Transit, the regional transit system. The Bellevue Transit Center, which serves both Metro and Sound Transit buses, is located in the heart of Downtown Bellevue and is connected to Interstate 405 by NE 6th St. with direct-access "Texas-T" HOV ramps. The Bellevue Transit Center will be adjacent to the Bellevue Downtown East Link Light Rail station, which is under construction and projected to open in 2023. Local buses run through Kirkland, Redmond, Issaquah, Renton, and the University District; regional buses go to Bothell, Lynnwood, Everett, Seattle, Renton, Kent, Auburn and Federal Way, among other cities.

Bellevue Way is the main north–south arterial through downtown. NE 8th St and NE 4th St are the main east–west arterials through Downtown. As of June 2010, the 10th St overpass is complete, creating a third bridge over the freeway. Later improvements to I-405 have smoothed the weave of traffic and access to SR-520.

Retail
Anchored by The Bellevue Collection and The Shops at The Bravern, downtown Bellevue is a regional shopping destination.  The Bellevue Collection is a trio of mixed-use complexes of shops, offices, hotels, and condos. Bellevue Square, Lincoln Square, and Bellevue Place feature more than 200 shops and restaurants, department stores, and a 16-screen cinema.
 
Bellevue Square is anchored by Macy's, Macy's Home Store and Nordstrom, later being expanded to feature Uniqlo, Zara, and the Northwest's first 365 by Whole Foods.

Opened in 2009, the Bravern is a high-end complex of shops, apartments, and offices located on the eastern edge of downtown adjacent to I-405.  It featured the only Neiman Marcus in the Northwest, which closed in 2020 following the company's bankruptcy.

Grocery stores in Downtown Bellevue include QFC, Safeway and H-Mart. Whole Foods, Uwajimaya and Trader Joe's are located in the Wilburton district just across I-405.

Parks
Bellevue Downtown Park and Rose Garden is a  park located in southwest downtown Bellevue.  It features a half-mile promenade flanked by shade trees along with a stepped canal, rose gardens, grassy fields, and a playground for children. Major holidays and activities are celebrated here, including the annual Bellevue Collection Bellevue Family 4 July, Summer Movie Nights, and the Magic Season Ice Arena. The Downtown Park is undergoing an expansion through the city's "Complete the Circle" project and will soon (2017) feature the Inspiration Playground and Sensory Garden.

Ashwood Park is a smaller green space located near the Bellevue Library, the largest in the King County Library System, and the future home of KidsQuest Children's Museum.

Economy
Downtown Bellevue is the headquarters for several major employers, including Paccar, Eddie Bauer, Valve, Bungie, Apptio, SAP Concur, Symetra Financial and Puget Sound Energy. Although headquartered in the neighboring city of Redmond, Microsoft is downtown Bellevue's largest employer with more than 6,000 workers. Amazon plans to bring 25,000 jobs to downtown Bellevue as part of the planned expansion of its Puget Sound headquarters. Meydenbauer Center hosts a variety of major conventions, trade shows, fundraisers, and corporate events. It also features the 410-seat Theatre at Meydenbauer Center.

Buildings

References

External links 

Neighborhoods in Bellevue, Washington
Tourist attractions in King County, Washington